Kim Boekbinder is a Canadian-born musician and filmmaker. Her music ranges from dark synth pop, to acoustic looping.

A longtime proponent of direct-to-fan marketing and social media, Boekbinder gained publicity for her take on touring/show-booking via a Kickstarter campaign.

In early 2012 Kim Boekbinder launched "Mission Control" a fundraising platform to finance the development of her second full-length album. Fans subscribe to a private website where songs and writings of the next album are shared.

Boekbinder currently resides in New York City.  On July 16, 2014, she announced that she had been granted United States citizenship.

She previously performed in the band Vermillion Lies with her sibling Zoe.

Career
Kim Boekbinder's first full-length solo album The Impossible Girl was a departure from her earlier acoustic work with Vermillion Lies, the album was produced by Boston producer, Sean Slade, who discovered her when Vermillion Lies opened for Amanda Palmer. The album was funded by a successful pre-order campaign which raised $20,000 in early 2010. The album was recorded at Mad Oak Studios in Allston, Massachusetts with engineer Benny Grotto.

In June, 2011, Boekbinder pre-sold her first show in New York City. The idea of the pre-sold show received a good deal of attention after she wrote an impassioned post for English author, Warren Ellis. The idea was explained further during a radio interview with the BBC News on June 28, 2011.

Boekbinder's second studio album, The Sky is Calling, was co-produced by Grammy-nominated engineer Joel Hamilton at Studio G in Brooklyn, NY. The album is described by Boekbinder as an electro-galactic space epic and features data-bent sounds of NASA data and a collaboration with astronomer Phil Plait.

In 2014 Boekbinder began recording and releasing "Ephemeral Songs" on Bandcamp.  They were called "ephemeral" because each song was only made available for a few weeks before being removed.

In 2016, Boekbinder wrote Pussy Grabs Back a response to then-presidential candidate Donald Trump's comments during a controversial interview that many commentators and lawyers have described as sexual assault.

In the spring of 2017, Boekbinder announced the launch of her own record label, Golden Glow Records, based in New York City.

Boekbinder's third studio album, Noisewitch, was released on September 8, 2017 on Golden Glow Records.

In 2016, she collaborated with Jay Z, dream hampton, & Molly Crabapple to create a video titled, "The War on Drugs is an Epic Fail"  which premiered in the New York Times

In 2017, she collaborated with the ACLU, Laverne Cox, Molly Crabapple, and Zackary Drucker, in making a video about transgender history and resistance.

Discography

Studio albums
 Split the Light (2021)
 Noisewitch (2017)
 The Sky is Calling (2013) 
 The Impossible Girl (2010)

Other Recording Projects
"The Infinite Minute" (2015) - 169 one-minute songs. One song for every $100 raised on Kickstarter to fund a home recording studio.
"Ephemeral Songs" (2014) - a series of singles released one at a time on Bandcamp.com. Each song was only up for a few weeks. 
"Moon Landing" (2012) - impromptu single with David J of Bauhaus
"Music for Stray Days" (2011) - original song to accompany the popular web comic The Secret Knots
"New York" (2011) - acoustic single, released in conjunction with original art by Molly Crabapple
"Such Great Heights" (2011) - 7" vinyl record with Amanda Palmer featuring a cover of The Postal Service song and Boekbinder's original "On the Other Side of the World"
"Thirty One" (2009) - 31 songs written and recorded in 31 days. One song released each day for a month.
"First the Bees" (2008) - 5 song EP (as Kim Vermillion)

Guest Appearances
"The Rime of the Ancient Mariner" (2012) by The Tiger Lillies - Kim Boekbinder plays toy piano on several songs
Say Hi To Your Neighborhood (2009) by Jim Avignon - Kim Boekbinder sings on "smalltalkworld"

With Vermillion Lies
 Separated by Birth (2006), Label: A Small Tribe Records, ASIN: B000HD1MZW
 Scream-Along EP (2007)
 What's in the Box? (2008), MP3, self-released, ASIN: B001BL2JFQ
 In New Orleans 7" vinyl (2008)
"Sister Magic" (2015) 4 song digital EP

References

External links

Year of birth missing (living people)
Living people
Canadian indie rock musicians
Musicians from Montreal
21st-century Canadian women musicians